Le Saint is a commune in the Morbihan department of Brittany in north-western France.

Breton language
The municipality launched a Breton linguistic plan through Ya d'ar brezhoneg on 24 February 2005.

Population

The population has been divided by three since the first world war.

Geography

Historically, it belongs to Cornouaille. Le Saint is border by Gourin to the west and the north, by Langonnet and Le Faouët to the east and by Guiscriff to the south. The river Inam forms the commune's western border and the river Moulin du Duc forms the commune's eastern border. The two rivers meet at the southern end of the commune at a place called Pont Briand. Apart of the village centre there are about eighty hamlets.

Map

List of places

History

The lords of Faouët, the Bouteville, lived in their castle in Le Saint in the fifteenth century.

thumb|center|The ruins of the castle at the beginning of the twentieth century.

Gallery

See also
Communes of the Morbihan department

References

External links

 Mayors of Morbihan Association 

Communes of Morbihan